"Any Man of Mine" is a song co-written and recorded by Canadian country music singer Shania Twain. It was issued to US radio in April 1995 as the second single from her second studio album The Woman in Me (1995). Twain wrote the song with Robert John "Mutt" Lange, who also produced it. The song became Twain's first number one hit at country radio, as well her second crossover hit cracking the top 40 on the pop charts. It was released to radio in April 1995, and topped the charts for two weeks in July. 

Though "Whose Bed Have Your Boots Been Under" was issued to US radio in January 1995 and "Any Man of Mine" being issued to radio in April 1995, Twain's label released her first two singles as double A-side single commercially in the USA in June 1995. In August 1995, the single was certified Gold for 500,000 sales. "Any Man of Mine" was released commercially as a stand-alone single internationally.

"Any Man of Mine" also proved to be a critical success; it was nominated for both Best Country Song and Best Female Country Vocal Performance at the 1996 Grammy Awards. It won Single of the Year at both the Canadian Country Music Awards and  Country Music Radio Awards in 1995. It also won Country Single of the Year at the 1996 Jukebox Awards and Song of the Year at the 1996 RPM Big Country Music Awards.

Critical reception
Larry Flick of Billboard wrote, "Twain aims right for the dance clubs with this hi-tech hoedown. The lyrics are dancefloor dumb, but the song is undeniably catchy. Besides, any song that borrows a vocal hook from the Three Stooges can't be all bad." British magazine Music Week gave the song five out of five, commenting, "Another Canadian singer breaking national borders and stylistic barriers. This debut single from the new album features hubby Mutt Lange's crunching but considered rock production (and vocals) plus enough country to catch the ear." The magazine's Alan Jones noted that "it is a very powerful singalong style song, with heavy syncopated drums – a la We Will Rock You – and has been on heavy rotation for some time on Country 1035."

Music video
The music video for "Any Man of Mine" was shot in Santa Ynez, California, and directed by John Derek and Charley Randazzo. The video showcases Twain's famed midriff, while she dances around in jeans and a jean-vest. The country theme of the video is prominent, filmed at a ranch, with Twain being around a horse, and driving a truck pulling a horse trailer. "Any Man of Mine" won the Canadian Country Music Award for Video of the Year, AOL's Online Music Award for Hottest Country Video and CMT Europe's Video of the Year. Two videos were made, one with the Video Version, which extends the ending of the Album Version very slightly, and one with the Alternate Mix, which removes the steel guitar present in the other version. The Video Version is available on Twain's DVD The Platinum Collection.

On YouTube, as of March 2023, "Any Man of Mine" is Twain's fourth most-viewed video with 171 million views, behind "You're Still the One" with 224 million, "From This Moment On" with 293 million views, and "Man! I Feel Like a Woman!" with 342 million.

Chart performance
"Any Man of Mine" debuted at number 66 on the US Billboard Hot Country Singles & Tracks chart the week of May 13, 1995. At that time, it was her highest debut, a record previously held by "Dance with the One That Brought You". It spent 20 weeks on the chart and peaked at number one on July 22, 1995, where it remained for two weeks. The song became Twain's first number one single and her first Top 10 single. The song was also the first number one on the Billboard country chart to be performed by a non-American since fellow Canadian Anne Murray hit number one with "Now and Forever (You and Me)" on April 26, 1986. The single also spent ten weeks atop Billboards Country Singles Sales chart. "Any Man of Mine" reached a peak of number 31 on the Billboard Hot 100, becoming her first single on that chart; the song reached number 13 in sales.

Official versions
Album Version (4:07)
Video Version (4:15)
Alternate Mix (4:15)1
Acapella (3:55)

1The Alternate Mix sees the removal of the Steel Guitar. This version was originally issued on the international pressings of the CD single but was not credited in the liner notes.

Track listingsUK CD single"Any Man of Mine" — 4:06
"Raining on Our Love" — 4:38
"God Ain't Gonna Getcha for That" — 2:44
"Still Under the Weather" — 3:06Europe CD single'''
"Any Man of Mine" — 4:06
"Still Under the Weather" — 3:06

Parodies
In 1995, disc jockey Gino Ruberto, then working at KEEY-FM in Minneapolis, Minnesota, recorded a parody called "Any Gal of Mine" under the pseudonym Gino the New Guy. This parody charted for twelve weeks on the Billboard Hot Country Singles   Tracks chart, peaking at number 56 despite not being distributed by a record label. Country music parodist Cledus T. Judd released a parody entitled "If Shania Was Mine" from his 1996 album I Stoled This Record''.

Charts

Weekly charts

Year-end charts

Certifications

Notes

1995 singles
Shania Twain songs
Songs written by Robert John "Mutt" Lange
Song recordings produced by Robert John "Mutt" Lange
Songs written by Shania Twain
Mercury Nashville singles
1995 songs
Canadian Country Music Association Single of the Year singles
Canadian Country Music Association Video of the Year videos
Music videos directed by John Derek